Interstate 40 (I-40) is an east–west Interstate Highway that has a  section in the US state of Arizona, connecting sections in California and New Mexico. The Interstate is also referred to as the Purple Heart Trail to honor those wounded in combat who have received the Purple Heart. It enters Arizona from the west at a crossing of the Colorado River southwest of Kingman. It travels eastward across the northern portion of the state, connecting the cities of Kingman, Ash Fork, Williams, Flagstaff, Winslow, and Holbrook. I-40 continues into New Mexico, heading to Albuquerque.

For the majority of its routing through Arizona, I-40 follows the historic alignment of US 66. The lone exception is a stretch between Kingman and Ash Fork where US 66 took a more northerly, less direct route that is now State Route 66 (SR 66). Construction of I-40 was ongoing in the 1960s and 1970s and reached completion in 1984. With the completion of I-40 in 1984, the entire routing of US 66 had been bypassed by Interstate Highways which led to its decertification a year later in 1985.

Route description

California to Flagstaff

I-40 enters Arizona from California at a bridge that crosses the Colorado River at Topock in Mohave County. It heads east from Topock and begins to curve toward the north at Franconia, completing the curve at Yucca. The Interstate continues to head north until it reaches Kingman. In this city, I-40 has a junction with US 93 at exit 48. US 93 heads toward the northwest from this interchange to Hoover Dam and Las Vegas. US 93 south begins to run concurrently with I-40 east as they both swing eastward through Kingman. The two later separate at exit 71 as US 93 heads toward the south toward Phoenix while I-40 continues east toward Flagstaff. Along the way, I-40 passes through the town of Seligman, then, at Ash Fork, it meets SR 89, the former U.S. Route that heads south to Prescott. Next, it passes through Williams, where it has an interchange with SR 64 (exit 165), which heads north toward Grand Canyon National Park. I-40 continues to the east to Flagstaff, where it has a major junction with I-17 at exit 195. I-17 heads south from this interchange to Phoenix.

Flagstaff to New Mexico
East of Flagstaff, I-40 heads toward the east-southeast direction as it goes through the town of Winslow. It continues toward this direction until it reaches Holbrook, where it curves toward the northeast. Along this stretch, it passes through Petrified Forest National Park and continues to the northeast, passing through Chambers, and enters the Navajo Nation. The highway still continues to the northeast to the New Mexico border southwest of Gallup, New Mexico, as it continues on toward Albuquerque.

History
With the exception of a stretch between Kingman and Flagstaff, I-40 directly replaced the famed US 66 across northern Arizona. Where possible, US 66 was upgraded to Interstate standards to become I-40 directly. Exceptions to this were through the central business districts of the cities and towns that US 66 passed through, and I-40 had to be built as a bypass outside the cities. On October 26, 1984, after the last section of I-40 was completed in Williams, US 66 was removed from the state highway system of Arizona. The portions through cities that did not overlap I-40 would become business loops of I-40.

Before the U.S. Routes
The routing of a road near the current corridor of I-40 in Arizona was first surveyed and built between 1857 and 1859. Lt. Edward Beale and his soldiers built the road along the 35th parallel that would come to be known as the Beale Wagon Road from Fort Smith, Arkansas, to the Colorado River to serve as a military wagon road. The road was a popular route for immigrants during the 1860s and 1870s until the transcontinental railroad was built across northern Arizona in the 1880s. In the early 1900s, the road became part of the National Old Trails Road, a transcontinental route from Baltimore, Maryland, to California, and the National Park to Park Highway, an auto trail linking the national parks of the west.

U.S. Route 66

In the 1920s, as a nationwide system of highways called the United States Numbered Highways was being developed, the route through was given the designation of US 60. This designation was controversial since designations that are multiples of 10 are assigned to transcontinental east–west routes and this route was a diagonal route from Chicago, Illinois, to Los Angeles, California. As a compromise to states east of Chicago that felt US 60 should go through their state, a different route was given the number 60, while the route from Chicago to Los Angeles was given the number 66.

By 1927, the routing of US 66 through Arizona had been laid out, but none of it had been paved yet. By 1935, nearly the entire route had been paved, with the lone exceptions being a short stretch northeast of Valentine and a stretch between Peach Springs and Seligman. By 1938, the entire route in Arizona had been paved. In 1953, US 66 was realigned between the California border and Kingman to an alignment to the southeast to avoid the mountain curves and grades of the original alignment. By 1961, several sections of the highway had been expanded to a four-lane divided highway in anticipation of the coming Interstate Highway. Four-lane sections included a section near Ash Fork, another section east of Winslow, and a section east of Holbrook near the Petrified Forest National Monument.

Planning
In Flagstaff, several different alternatives were considered as a potential routing of the new Interstate through the area. The alternatives consisted of a routing north of downtown, south of downtown, through downtown along the Santa Fe Railroad right-of-way near the alignment of US 66, and a more elaborate alternative of a routing above downtown on a long overpass. In January 1959, the Flagstaff Chamber of Commerce recommended to the Bureau of Public Roads that the route south of downtown be used which was approved by the Flagstaff City Council and the Board of Supervisors for Coconino County. This recommendation was accepted and would become the planned routing of I-40 in Flagstaff. Business owners along US 66 were opposed to this routing as it would draw motorists away from main through route of the time, US 66. As a result, they created the No By-Pass Committee and sent a proposal to the Chamber of Commerce's Roads and Highways Committee to conduct a study of the feasibility of a route for I-40 through downtown along the Santa Fe railroad right-of-way. The Committee sent an inquiry to the railroad concerning the proposal. The railroad rejected the proposed rerouting of their main rail lines, citing that it would result in worse grades than what currently exists, and, in order to reduce those grades, considerable lengthening of the rail line would be required. With a routing through town now out of the question, the business owners along US 66 drafted a city ordinance, known as Initiative 200, that was filed with the city of Flagstaff in November 1959 to appear on the general election ballot in March 1960. The ordinance would, in effect, ban all new commercial businesses on I-40, all routes leading from I-40 to US 66, and the area between I-40 and US 66. In a record voter turnout, voters overwhelmingly voted against the ordinance by a vote of 2,280 to 556.

In 1965, the routing of I-40 west of Kingman was being reconsidered from the planned route through Needles, California, to a route to the north passing through Searchlight in southern Nevada and connecting with I-15 further north of its present connection with I-15. The rationale for the proposal was that it would be an overall shorter route and would cost much less to construct. The proposal was met with stiff opposition, including all four US senators from California and Arizona sending the Secretary of Commerce letters requesting that the routing through Needles be retained. This proposal was eventually abandoned in 1966, and the routing through Needles was kept.

Construction

The construction of the  route of I-40 across Arizona took nearly 25 years to complete with the last segment being completed in 1984, much longer than the ambitious goal of finishing by 1972. By the end of 1960,  had been completed with an additional  being worked on. In 1964, construction was still on schedule with  complete and an additional  under construction. Funding was becoming an issue at this time as the state lacked the available funds to stay on pace with a 1972 completion goal. By 1967, Arizona had completed almost half of the highway with  complete and another  under construction. In 1968, the bypass around Flagstaff was complete with three interchanges, two at each end of where US 66 split off from I-40 to enter the city and one at the I-17 interchange. An additional interchange at Butler Avenue was completed a year later. One of the big improvements of I-40 over US 66 was the construction of the segment between Kingman and Ash Fork. Construction of the $69.1 million (equivalent to $ in ) segment was also to be a much safer route as the US 66 alignment had one of the highest fatality rates of any section of highway in Arizona. This section of the Interstate was complete in 1978. Construction of the $7.7 million (equivalent to $ in ) bypass around Winslow began in 1977. I-40 was completed in Arizona in 1984, with the completion of a  section in Williams. This was also the last section of US 66 to be bypassed by the Interstate, which led to it being decertified by the American Association of State Highway and Transportation Officials (AASHTO) the following year.

Exit list

See also

References

External links

40
 Arizona
Transportation in Mohave County, Arizona
Transportation in Yavapai County, Arizona
Transportation in Coconino County, Arizona
Transportation in Navajo County, Arizona
Transportation in Apache County, Arizona